Bergljót Arnalds (born 15 October 1968) is an Icelandic actress, writer, television representative and producer. She has been awarded the Icelandic AUÐAR-verðlaunin, a pioneer's award, for creating the first Icelandic computer game, Stafakarlarnir.

She is best known for being the author of a best-selling children's book and for her TV work. She was the producer and host of children's television program 2001 nights, which aired on SkjárEinn.

She has played various roles on stage and in films. Among her roles are Dolly in The Devil's Island, Lucy in Dracula, Stella in A Streetcar Named Desire and Sophie in Sophie's World.

Books
 1996 – Stafakarlarnir (Icelandic)
2006 – The Most Amazing Alphabet Tale (English)
 1997 – Tóta og Tíminn
 1998 – Talnapúkinn
 2001 – Gralli Gormur og stafaseiðurinn mikli
 2001 – Í leit að tímanum
 2003 – Gralli Gormur og litadýrðin mikla
 2005 – Jólasveinasaga (Icelandic)
2005 – The Thirteen Icelandic Santas (English)
 2007 – Gralli Gormur og dýrin í Afríku (Icelandic)
 2007 – Mousey Rattail in Africa (English)
 2011 – Íslensku Húsdýrin og Trölli (Icelandic)
 2015 – Rusladrekinn (Icelandic)

CD-Roms
 1997 – Stafakarlarnir
 1999 – Talnapúkinn
 2004 – Gralli Gormur og stafirnir

See also 

 List of Icelandic writers
 Icelandic literature

References

External links
 Bergljót Arnalds' profile
 profile
 

1968 births
Living people
Bergljót Arnalds
Icelandic women children's writers
Bergljót Arnalds
Bergljót Arnalds
Bergljót Arnalds